Gölköy is a town and district of Ordu Province in the Black Sea region of Turkey. According to the 2000 census, population of the district is 66,491 of which 24,162 live in the town of Gölköy.

Places of interest include the Byzantine castle of Habsamana, and a number of places for walking and climbing including the village of Cihadiye and the lake of Ulugöl.

The villages of Gölköy district include Ahmetli, Akçalı, Bayıralan, Bulut, Cihadiye, Çatak, Çetilli, Emirler, Güzelyayla, Haruniye, Hürriyet, İçyaka, Kaleköy, Konak, Kozören, Özlü, Süleymaniye, and Yuvapınar.

Gallery

Notes

References

External links

 District governor's official website 
 District municipality's official website 
 Road map of Gölköy and environs
 Detailed road map of Gölköy district
 Various images of Gölköy, Ordu

Populated places in Ordu Province
Districts of Ordu Province